Matthew Formston (born 21 July 1978) is a legally blind Australian Professional Para Surfer and former professional Para Cyclist. Formston won gold and silver medals at the 2014 and 2015 UCI Para-cycling Track World Championships and represented Australia with pilot Nick Yallouris, at the 2016 Rio Paralympics. Formston also holds three consecutive world titles for Surfing (2017, 2018 and 2020) at the ISA Para Surfing World Championships (VI Division) as the 2016 to 2019 Australian Champion, 2018 and 2019 US Adaptive Open (Gold) and 2017, 2018, 2019 Dukes Ocean Fest Hawaii Gold medalist.

Personal
Formston was born on 21 July 1978 in Sydney, New South Wales. At the age of five, Formston was diagnosed with Macular Dystrophy eventually reducing his sight to 0% central vision and 5% peripheral vision. He is legally blind. With a Diploma of Health Science and extensive business and competitive sport experience, Formston holds a national executive role as Head of Sustainability and Corporate Social Responsibility. He is also a sought after keynote speaker, business coach and offers strategic training workshops to promote high performing teams and resilient leadership. Matt Formston and his wife Rebecca have three children and live on the Central Coast of New South Wales.

Career

Competitive sports 
Formston's cycling career began in 2009 while on a charity ride for the Macular Disease Foundation. The ride took Formston from Sydney to Melbourne and he successfully completed it on a single bike. In 2012, Formston was named the Central Coast Cyclist of the Year. Formston originally rode competitively with Phillip Thuaux in 2010 before pairing with Mick Curran in 2012 as a tandem partner and the pair were known as OzTandem. Curran, a fully sighted competitor, held the role of pilot for the duo. They went on to win gold in both track and road cycling on most continents around the globe and amassed 12 Australian National Titles between 2012 and 2016.

In 2013, the pair won gold in the Tandem Road Race at the UCI Para-cycling Road World Cup in Canada. In 2014, Formston and Curran set a new world record in the Tandem Pursuit event clocking a time of 4:11.213. In the same year, they took home the gold medal at the 2014 UCI Para-cycling Track World Championships in Aguascalientes, Mexico. Formston and Curran competed in the 2015 UCI Para-cycling Track World Championships in Apeldoorn, Netherlands and finished second in the Tandem Pursuit.

Formston and Curran's bond went beyond the tandem bike with the pair starting their own business known as Champion Vision.

At the 2016 Rio Paralympics, Formston's new cycling pilot was Nick Yallouris from Chittaway Point, New South Wales eventually announcing his retirement from competitive cycling the same year.

In 2016, Formston was awarded the New South Wales Institute of Sport Scholarship to continue his pursuit of competitive cycling and surfing.

In 2017, Formston appeared alongside Ron McCallum on the Season 2 premiere episode of ABC's You Can't Ask That entitled "Blind People".

As a professional surfer, Formston is the current Para Surfing World Champion, winning the 2017, 2018 and 2020 ISA World Para Surfing Championships (VI Division). He won the 2016, 2017, 2018 and 2019  Australian Championships as well as the 2018 and 2020 US Adaptive Open (Gold). In addition, Formston achieved the 2017, 2018 and 2019 Dukes Ocean Fest Hawaii (Gold) and took home the 2018 Huntington Adaptive Pro (Gold).

Formston has a range of surfing sponsors including Firewire, Slater Designs and Billabong.

Executive and professional coaching 
Matt Formston is a sought after keynote speaker in strategic leadership, offering executive business coaching and professional workshop facilitation. As a Gold medallist, world title holder and Paralympian, Formston uses his extensive experience in sport psychology, visualisation, goal setting as well as corporate experience as a successful business executive to deliver tactics to turn challenges into strengths.

Formston has delivered individual and group coaching to a range of corporate executives across companies such as Hewlett Packard, Tesla, Pepsi Co, Optus, Lend Lease, Institution of Civil Engineers, Deloitte, Orthoptics Australia, Vision Australia and Macquarie University.

As Chair of the Macquarie Business Park Partnership, Formston has led corporate executives to deliver a modern approach to overcoming community disadvantage.

Recognition
2012 - Central Coast Cyclist of the Year

References

External links

Cycling Australia profile
We Believe - Matt Formston and Nick Yallouris
Personal Website

1978 births
Living people
Australia at the 2016 Summer Paralympics
Paralympic cyclists of Australia
Cyclists at the 2016 Summer Paralympics
Paralympic cyclists with a vision impairment
Australian blind people
Sportsmen from New South Wales
Australian male cyclists